Ctenitis is a fern genus in the family Dryopteridaceae, subfamily Dryopteridoideae, in the Pteridophyte Phylogeny Group classification of 2016 (PPG I).

Selected species
The genus has a large number of species.
Ctenitis squamigera (Brack.) Copel.
Ctenitis pallatangana (Hook.) Ching

References

Dryopteridaceae
Fern genera